Ambohimilanja is a rural municipality located in the Atsinanana region of eastern Madagascar.  It is located in the Marolambo District.

References

Populated places in Atsinanana